The following lists events that happened during 1976 in South Africa.

Incumbents
 State President: Nico Diederichs.
 Prime Minister: John Vorster.
 Chief Justice: Frans Lourens Herman Rumpff.

Events

January
 5 – The SABC begins the country's first television service.

March
 27 – The South African Defence Force withdraws from Angola and concludes Operation Savannah.

May
 29 – Eskom announces that it will order two nuclear power stations from France.

June
 16 – Student riots break out in Soweto and Hector Pieterson, Hastings Ndlovu and two white officials of the West Rand Board are some of the casualties.
 23 – Prime Minister John Vorster and United States Secretary of State Henry Kissinger hold talks in West Germany over the Rhodesian issue.

August
 25–26 – Prime Minister John Vorster and President of Zambia Kenneth Kaunda meet at Victoria Falls.

September
 13 – The Cillié Commission of Inquiry into the 16 June riots in Soweto begins.
 30 – Michael Lapsley, Anglican priest and social activist, arrives in Lesotho after his visa was not renewed in South Africa.

October
 26 – Transkei gains independence from South Africa.

Unknown date
 Umkhonto we Sizwe's central operations headquarters is established and the process of establishing training camps in Angola begins with the establishment of Gabela Training Camp.

Births
 16 January – Jonathan Solomons, South African football player
 20 January – Ian Syster, long-distance runner (d. 2004)
 30 January – Kaya Malotana, former rugby player & tv rugby analyst
 February – Johan Thom, visual artist
 9 February – Colin Moss, actor and TV host
 22 February – Faan Rautenbach, rugby player
 2 March – Gaffie du Toit, rugby player
 5 March – Wayne Denne, field hockey player
 11 March – Black Coffee (DJ), DJ and record producer
 30 March – Chantal Botts, badminton player
 31 March – Thandiswa Mazwai, singer & songwriter
 2 April – Rory Sabbatini, golfer
 5 April – David Staniforth, field hockey goalkeeper
 20 April – Calvin Marlin, football player
 25 April – Breyton Paulse, rugby player
 19 May – Zuluboy, rapper & actor
 12 June – Stewart Carson, badminton player
 3 July – Bobby Skinstad, Springboks captain
 1 August – Lucky Lekgwathi, football player
 24 August – DJ Tira, DJ, Record Producer and Businessman, founder of Afrotainment
 11 September – Vuyo Dabula, actor
 13 September – Linda Sokhulu, actress
 3 October – Carl Beukes, actor
 14 October – Tokollo Tshabalala, Kwaito musician, most well-known for being a member of music group TKzee
 3 December – Mark Boucher, cricketer
 15 December – Kabelo Mabalane, Kwaito musician, TV personality & Pastor
 30 December – Ashley Callie, actress (d. 2008)

Deaths
 19 March – Stuart Cloete, novelist, essayist and biographer (b. 1897)
 26 April – Sid James, South African-born British actor (b. 1913)
 16 June – Melville Edelstein, sociologist, killed due to Soweto uprising (b. 1919)
 16 June – Hastings Ndlovu, Soweto uprising casualty (b. 1961)
 16 June – Hector Pieterson, Soweto uprising casualty (b. 1963)
 9 September – Ivan Mitford-Barberton, sculptor, writer and herald (b. 1896)
 6 November – Sydney Skaife, entomologist and naturalist (b. 1889)

Railways

Locomotives
Three new Cape gauge locomotive types enter service on the South African Railways:
 March – The first of one hundred Class 35-400 General Electric type U15C diesel-electric locomotives.
 September – The first of one hundred Class 35-600 General Motors Electro-Motive Division type GT18MC diesel-electric locomotives.
 The first of one hundred Class 6E1, Series 6 electric locomotives.

See also
1976 in South African television

References

South Africa
Years in South Africa
History of South Africa